Penkimia is a genus of terrestrial orchid native to high elevations in the Himalayas of Yunnan and Nagaland. It has only one known species, Penkimia nagalandensis.

References 

Monotypic Epidendroideae genera
Orchids of Yunnan
Flora of Assam (region)
Orchids of India
Terrestrial orchids